Smith v. Allwright, 321 U.S. 649 (1944), was a landmark decision of the United States Supreme Court with regard to voting rights and, by extension, racial desegregation. It overturned the Texas state law that authorized parties to set their internal rules, including the use of white primaries. The court ruled that it was unconstitutional for the state to delegate its authority over elections to parties in order to allow discrimination to be practiced. This ruling affected all other states where the party used the white primary rule.

The Democratic Party had effectively excluded minority voter participation by this means, another device for legal disenfranchisement of blacks across the South beginning in the late 19th century.

Background

Lonnie E. Smith, a black dentist from the Fifth Ward area of Houston and a voter in Harris County, Texas, sued county election official S. S. Allwright for the right to vote in a primary election being conducted by the Democratic Party. He challenged the 1923 state law that authorized the party to establish its internal rules; the party required all voters in its primary to be white.
The Democratic Party had controlled politics in the South since the late 19th century (see Solid South) and the state legislatures of the former Confederacy effectively disenfranchised blacks in the period from 1890 to 1908, by new constitutions and laws raising barriers to voter registration and voting. This crippled the Republican Party in all southern states except Tennessee and North Carolina where exceedingly loyal Unionist Appalachian white Republicanism remained, and resulted in the only competitive elections being held within the Democratic Party primary. Texas had used poll taxes and the white primary to exclude nearly all blacks, Hispanics, and other minorities from voting (the poll tax also had the effect of excluding poor whites prior to the establishment of mechanisms like the Grandfather clause which refranchised them).

Issue
Smith v. Allwright questioned whether or not states had the constitutional right to deny voters based on party membership. The Democratic Party of Texas denied Smith the right to vote on the basis of his skin color. Smith was attempting to cast his vote for a Democratic primary in which candidates for the House of Representatives, Senate, and Governor were being nominated, in addition to other state officers. The Texas Constitution states that every person qualified by residence in a district or county, in addition to other factors that are not relevant, "shall be deemed a qualified elector" in Article VI, §2, and Chapters Twelve and Thirteen of the statutes require primary elections for Senators, Representatives, and state officers. The Democratic Party of Texas was a "voluntary association" and protected from interference from the state except "in the interest of fair methods and a fair expression by their members of their preferences in the selection of their nominees, the State may regulate such elections by proper laws," which is a right that is protected in the Bill of Rights of Texas.

The party is allowed to determine its own policies and membership according to Waples v. Marrast, and adopted a policy that all white citizens qualified to vote in Texas were eligible for membership, therefore allowing only white citizens to vote. Holding policies that only allow citizens of a particular race or color to vote is an inherently discriminatory practice. The Fourteenth, Fifteenth, and Seventeenth Amendments protect against such actions from any state. The argument, however, is whether the Texas Democratic Party is independent from the state and free to make policies as it pleases. Smith was not allowed to vote in a Democratic primary election on the basis of his skin color. He, the petitioner, argues that since he was not allowed to participate in a state election, the Party is not independent of the state. There were two conflicting Supreme Court decisions that were impeding the judicial precedent for this case: Grovey v. Townsend and United States v. Classic.

Grovey v. Townsend 
In Grovey v. Townsend, the petitioner argued that he was denied a ballot for the Democratic party primary election, even though he is a lawful citizen of the United States of America. The petitioner was going to be absent on the day of the election and demanded an absentee ballot. The petitioner was denied the ballot on the grounds of a statute of the Democratic Convention of Texas which stated:

"Be it resolved that all white citizens of the Texas who are qualified to vote under the Constitution and laws of the state shall be eligible to membership in the Democratic party and as such entitled to participate in its deliberations."

This denial on the grounds of race and color was argued to be a direct and unlawful violation of the Fourteenth and Fifteenth Amendments of the Constitution of the United States of America. Denying a ballot on the basis of the petitioner's race or color is legal under Texas law, but unconstitutional. The Fourteenth Amendment states that no citizen, naturalized or born, shall have their rights infringed by any law, nor shall they be deprived of life, liberty, or property without due process of law, nor deny any citizen equal protection under its laws. 

The main question in Grovey was if a declaration of party membership equated state action. The argument of the respondents was that the resolution of the state convention limiting membership did not limit the participation of black voters, particularly the petitioner. The Supreme Court of the United States ruled that the respondent did not discriminate against the petitioner and therefore did not deny him any Fourteenth or Fifteenth Amendment rights.

United States v. Classic 
In U.S. v. Classic, two federal indictments were brought against six election commissioners, alleging conspiracy and corruption in the Democratic primary election for U.S. Representative. They were charged with miscounting and altering the ballots that were cast. The indictment was challenged because Newberry v. United States held that primary elections are not subject to the same Congressional oversight as general elections. Therefore, the question was if Congress is allowed to regulate primaries, specifically to protect voters from miscounts or altered ballots. The Supreme Court of the United States ruled that Article I of the Constitution authorizes Congress to regulate elections, in addition to allowing Congress to choose which constitutional powers are carried out.

Decision
The Supreme Court ruled 8—1 that Texas was indeed abridging Smith's Fifteenth Amendment right to vote, which was also denying his Fourteenth Amendment right to equal protection under the law. The unconstitutional practice of denying voters based on their race was discriminatory and Texas was held responsible, since it was delegating its authority to the Democratic Party. The Grovey v. Townsend decision was therefore overruled and Smith's previous denials were reversed. Thurgood Marshall, who would become the Supreme Court's first black justice, represented the NAACP in the case. He championed this decision and later stated that this was his most important case.

Dissent
Justice Roberts wrote a dissenting opinion for the Smith case. He was the only disagreeing justice, and argued that this decision was soon going to be overruled. He stated that three cases had been ruled and subsequently overruled on this issue already, maintaining that the seemingly ambiguous nature of rulings in these cases meant that this ruling did not follow the historical precedent. He also argued that this case was different from Classic; in Louisiana, elections are run by the state, making them state elections, but Texas party elections are run by the party, which does not put them under the jurisdiction of the state.  Justice Roberts further contended that the decision "tends to bring adjudications of this tribunal into the same class as a restricted railroad ticket, good for this day and train only."

Implications
This decision enabled the revival of black participation in Texas politics, for those voters who could get through the discriminatory voter registration process. Smith's efforts inspired Barbara Jordan, a Fifth Ward resident who would later become a black politician in Texas. The Smith case was decided in 1944. By 1948, the number of registered black voters in the South rose fourfold, from 200,000 in 1940 to 800,000 in 1948, and by 1952, it rose to over one million.  This decision also helped reiterate the idea that public events run by private organizations, especially elections, are held to the same constitutional standards as all fully public events.

References

Further reading

External links

1944 in United States case law
20th-century American trials
African-American segregation in the United States
Civil rights movement case law
History of voting rights in the United States
United States Supreme Court cases
United States Supreme Court cases of the Stone Court
United States equal protection case law
United States Fifteenth Amendment case law
United States Seventeenth Amendment case law
American Civil Liberties Union litigation
Texas elections
Texas Democratic Party
Primary elections in the United States
Harris County, Texas
United States elections case law
Democratic Party (United States) litigation
United States racial discrimination case law